The 1856 State of the Union Address was given by Franklin Pierce, the 14th president of the United States.  It was presented to the 34th United States Congress by the Clerk of the United States House of Representatives. He said, "it is necessary only to say that the internal prosperity of the country, its continuous and steady advancement in wealth and population and in private as well as public well-being, attest the wisdom of our institutions and the predominant spirit of intelligence and patriotism which, notwithstanding occasional irregularities of opinion or action resulting from popular freedom, has distinguished and characterized the people of America."  He also stated, "In the long series of acts of indirect aggression, the first was the strenuous agitation by citizens of the Northern States, in Congress and out of it, of the question of Negro emancipation in the Southern States."  President Pierce supported the Kansas-Nebraska act.  This neutralized the issue of slavery in the central states, and did not say whether to allow it or not.

References

State of the Union addresses
Presidency of Franklin Pierce
34th United States Congress
State of the Union Address
State of the Union Address
State of the Union Address
State of the Union Address
State of the Union